Spring Bay may refer to:

Australia 
 Municipality of Spring Bay, Tasmania

Canada 
 Spring Bay, Ontario
 Spring Bay, Saskatchewan

United States 
 Spring Bay, Illinois
 Spring Bay Township, Woodford County, Illinois

See also
 Glamorgan-Spring Bay Council, a local government area in Tasmania